Ines Geißler (later Kaulfuss, born 16 February 1963 in Marienberg, Saxony), commonly spelled Ines Geissler in English, is a former butterfly swimmer from East Germany, who won the gold medal in the 200 m butterfly at the 1980 Summer Olympics in Moscow, Soviet Union.

References

 
 

1963 births
Living people
People from Marienberg
Olympic swimmers of East Germany
Female butterfly swimmers
Swimmers at the 1980 Summer Olympics
Olympic gold medalists for East Germany
World record setters in swimming
World Aquatics Championships medalists in swimming
European Aquatics Championships medalists in swimming
Medalists at the 1980 Summer Olympics
Olympic gold medalists in swimming
Recipients of the Patriotic Order of Merit in gold
Sportspeople from Saxony